Modibo Tounty Guindo is a magistrate who serves the Malian Ministry of Justice and sits on the African Court on Human and Peoples' Rights.

He has acted as technical counsel to the Ministry of Justice and served as a member of the Malian delegation to the 2003 Conference of Governmental Structures responsible for Human Rights in the French-speaking zone.

References

Judges of the African Court on Human and Peoples' Rights
Living people
Malian judges
Malian judges of international courts and tribunals
Year of birth missing (living people)
21st-century Malian people